This is a list of people who have served as Lord Lieutenant of Bedfordshire. Since 1711, all Lords Lieutenant have also been Custos Rotulorum of Bedfordshire.

William Parr, 1st Marquess of Northampton 1549–1551
Oliver St John, 1st Baron St John of Bletso 1560–1569
Henry Grey, 6th Earl of Kent 12 September 1586– 31 January 1615
Charles Grey, 7th Earl of Kent 25 February 1615– 26 September 1623 jointly with
Henry Grey, 8th Earl of Kent 27 July 1621 – 31 October 1627 jointly with
Thomas Wentworth, 1st Earl of Cleveland 9 May 1625 – 25 March 1667 jointly with
Henry Grey, 8th Earl of Kent 29 January 1629 – 29 November 1639
Oliver St John, 1st Earl of Bolingbroke 1639–1646 (Parliamentary)
Robert Bruce, Lord Bruce of Whorlton 1646 (Parliamentary; nominated by House of Lords)
Henry Grey, 10th Earl of Kent 1646 (Parliamentary; nominated by House of Commons)
Interregnum
Robert Bruce, 1st Earl of Ailesbury 26 July 1660 – 20 October 1685
Thomas Bruce, 2nd Earl of Ailesbury 26 November 1685 – 10 May 1689
William Russell, 1st Duke of Bedford 10 May 1689 – 7 September 1700
Lord Edward Russell 22 November 1700 – 27 November 1701
Wriothesley Russell, 2nd Duke of Bedford 27 November 1701 – 26 May 1711
Henry Grey, 1st Duke of Kent 14 September 1711 – 5 June 1740
vacant
John Russell, 4th Duke of Bedford 21 May 1745 – 5 January 1771
John FitzPatrick, 2nd Earl of Upper Ossory 6 February 1771 – 13 February 1818
Thomas de Grey, 2nd Earl de Grey 17 March 1818 – 14 November 1859
Francis Russell, 7th Duke of Bedford 7 December 1859 – 14 May 1861
Francis Cowper, 7th Earl Cowper 7 June 1861 – 18 July 1905
Beauchamp Mowbray St John, 17th Baron St John of Bletso 30 October 1905 – 10 May 1912
Samuel Howard Whitbread 16 July 1912 – 8 January 1936
George Lawson Johnston, 1st Baron Luke 8 January 1936 – 23 February 1943
Sir Dealtry Charles Part 15 May 1943 – 7 June 1957
Simon Whitbread 7 June 1957 – 26 April 1978
Hanmer Cecil Hanbury 26 April 1978 – 5 January 1991
Sir Samuel Whitbread KCVO 28 February 1991 – 22 February 2012
Helen Nellis 22 February 2012 – 2022
Susan Lousada 7 September 2022 - present

References

Previous Lord Lieutenants

Bedfordshire
Local government in Bedfordshire